Richard Luther Crutcher (November 25, 1889 – June 19, 1952) was a former Major League Baseball pitcher. He played two seasons with the Boston Braves from 1914 to 1915.

References

External links

Boston Braves players
Major League Baseball pitchers
Kansas City Blues (baseball) players
Muskogee Navigators players
Sioux City Packers players
Johnstown Johnnies players
Webb City Webfeet players
Sapulpa Oilers players
Enid Railroaders players
St. Joseph Drummers players
Jersey City Skeeters players
Joplin Miners players
Baseball players from Kentucky
People from Frankfort, Kentucky
1889 births
1952 deaths
Frankfort Statesmen players